is a city located in Aichi Prefecture, Japan. , the city had an estimated population of 92,179 in 39,382 households, and a population density of 2,739 persons per km2.

Geography

Ōbu is located in the far northeastern neck of Chita Peninsula in southern Aichi Prefecture, and is bordered by the metropolis of Nagoya to the north.

Climate
The city has a climate characterized by hot and humid summers, and relatively mild winters (Köppen climate classification Cfa).

Demographics
Per Japanese census data, the population of Ōbu has been increasing steadily over the past 70 years.

Neighboring municipalities
Aichi Prefecture
Nagoya (Midori-ku)
Tōkai
Toyoake
Kariya
Higashiura

History

Late modern period
The village of Ōbu was established within Chita District, Aichi on October 1, 1889, with the establishment of the modern municipalities system.
On May 1, 1906, Ōbu annexed the neighboring villages of Yoshida, Kyowa, Kitasaka, Yokote, Nagagusa and part of the village of Morioka.
It was elevated to town status on November 1, 1915.

Contemporary history
Ōbu became a city on September 1, 1970.

Government

Ōbu has a mayor-council form of government with a directly elected mayor and a unicameral city legislature of 19 members. The city contributes one member to the Aichi Prefectural Assembly.  In terms of national politics, the city is part of Aichi District 7 of the lower house of the Diet of Japan.

External relations

Twin towns – Sister cities

International
Sister cities
Port Phillip（Victoria, Australia）
since November 20, 1993

Economy

Tertiary sector of the economy

Commerce
Ōbu has a mixed economic base due to its proximity to the Nagoya metropolis and numerous transportation connections.

Education

University
Shigakkan University
University of Human Environments, Ōbu campus

Schools
Ōbu has nine public elementary schools and four public junior high schools operated by the city government, and three public high schools operated by the Aichi Prefectural Board of Education.

Transportation

Railways

Conventional lines
Central Japan Railway Company
Tōkaidō Main Line：-  -  -
Taketoyo Line： -

Roads

Expressways
Isewangan Expressway
Chitahantō Road

Japan National Route

Notable people from Ōbu 
Kumiko Koiwai, figure skater
Kyoko Takezawa, violinist
Masayoshi Nagata, mathematician
Hidehiko Yoshida, Olympic gold-medalist judoka
Takahiro Nakai, Judoka

References

External links

   (with link to pages in English)
 Sister Cities by the Sea - information on the relationship between Obu and Port Phillip (English and Japanese content).

 
Cities in Aichi Prefecture